George Harper (19 August 1867 – 7 June 1937) was a New Zealand rugby union player. A three-quarter, Harper represented Nelson at a provincial level, and was a member of the New Zealand national side, the All Blacks, on the 1893 tour to Australia. He played three matches for the All Blacks, but did not play in an international.

Harper was educated at Nelson College from 1882 to 1885. He died suddenly in 1937 after boarding a train at Paeroa station.

References

1867 births
1937 deaths
New Zealand rugby union players
New Zealand international rugby union players
People educated at Nelson College
Nelson rugby union players
Rugby union players from Nelson, New Zealand
Rugby union three-quarters